Francesco Albergotti (6 June 1304 – 3 December 1376)  was an Italian jurist of the 14th century.

Life 
Born in 1304 from the Albergotti,  the biggest Guelph family in Arezzo for the role they had in the political, religious and military life of the city.
He started his studies at the University of Perugia, first in philosophy, then in law, student of the famous Baldo degli Ubaldi.
He started a career as a lawyer in Arezzo, and in 1349 he moved to Florence, where he gained a considerable fame as a teacher, being named "solidae veritatis doctor" (doctor of solid thruths).

He wrote comments to the Digest and some books of the Codex Theodosianus (in various manuscripts), and other different consilia (published in 1563 in Venice).
He died in Florence in 1376.

Works

Manuscripts

References 

1304 births
1376 deaths
Italian jurists
14th-century Italian jurists